Kim Seok-woo (born May 6, 1983) is a South Korean football defender who since 2007 has played for Busan I'Park (formerly Pohang Steelers and Gwangju Sangmu).

References

External links
 

1983 births
Living people
South Korean footballers
Association football defenders
Busan IPark players
Pohang Steelers players
Gimcheon Sangmu FC players
K League 1 players